Gaspar de Quiroga y Vela   (Madrigal de las Altas Torres, Ávila,  13 January 1512 – 20 November 1594) was a prominent Catholic official who rose to become General Inquisitor of Spain, from 1573 to 1594, and Archbishop of Toledo from 1577 to 1594. He was named a Cardinal by Pope Gregory XIII in 1578. He was the nephew of the 1st Bishop of Michoacán, Mexico,  Vasco de Quiroga, (1470 - 1565).

Biography 
He was educated as a Doctor in Theology and Law at the University of Salamanca. He was sent by King Philip II as an envoy to Rome and to the Spanish-administered territories in the Italian peninsula.

He served as a member of the Spanish High Council of Justice since 1563 and as Bishop of Cuenca, (1561–1577), being then promoted to Archbishop of Toledo, to replace former Imperial diplomat Archbishop of Toledo, Navarrese from the Dominican Order Bartolomé de Carranza (Miranda de Arga, Navarra, 1503 – Rome, Italy,  2 May  1576) in prison in Rome for some further 9  years, while defended there in front of Pope Pius V, deceased May 1572,  by Navarrese Martín de Azpilcueta y Jaureguizar (Barásoain, Navarra, 13 December 1492 - Rome, Italy, 21 June 1586) to take him out of the clutches of Inquisitor Fernando de Valdés Salas, (1483 - 1567), who had detained him previously for the period August 1559 - April 1567, some 8 years.

He was a patron in Toledo of the Greek-Spanish painter Doménikos Theotokópoulos, usually known as El Greco, (1541 - resident in Toledo, Spain, since  1577 - Toledo, Spain, 1614).

It is claimed that Quiroga portrait is found in the face of Saint Augustine in the famous Greco painting The Burial of the Count of Orgaz.

Quiroga liberated from the Inquisition's prisons the mystical poet Fray Luis de León, (1527 - 1591) who had been imprisoned for over 4 years at Valladolid, from March 1572 until December 1576, for publishing, amongst other things, a Spanish translation of the Song of Solomon, both of his parents having Jewish ancestry albeit being himself an Augustinian monk expert in Greek, Latin and Hebrew.

Around 1584, Quiroga built at the other side of the River Tagus, in the area known as the "Cigarrales", a summer house now occupied by a hotel.

Episcopal succession

See also

Spanish Inquisition

References

External links
Caminodelaordendesantiago.net
PIZARRO LLORENTE, Henar.  "Un gran patrón en la corte de Felipe II : Don Gaspar de Quiroga".Pizarro Llorente, Henar.  Publ.  Madrid : Universidad Pontificia de Comillas, (2004), 620 pages ; 24 cm., Bibliography and Index, 
Descargas.cervantesvirtual.com
Cervantesvirtual.com
Books.google.es
Madrigal-aatt.net

1512 births
1595 deaths
People from the Province of Ávila
16th-century Spanish cardinals
Bishops of Cuenca
Grand Inquisitors of Spain
Archbishops of Toledo
University of Salamanca alumni